Nicholas Muszynski (born November 19, 1998) is an American professional basketball player for Astoria Bydgoszcz of the Polish Basketball League (PLK). He played college basketball for the Belmont Bruins of the Ohio Valley Conference (OVC).

Early life and high school career
Growing up, Muszynski played volleyball and swam, but began focusing on basketball in sixth grade. He admired Tim Duncan for his fundamentals, modelling his game after him. Muszynski played basketball for Saint Charles Preparatory School in Columbus, Ohio He was a member of the junior varsity team in his sophomore season, before being promoted to the varsity team and averaging 11.5 points and seven rebounds per game as a junior. In his senior season, Muszynski averaged 16 points, 11.3 rebounds and 2.5 blocks per game, leading his team to a 24–3 record. He committed to playing college basketball for Belmont over offers from Air Force, Stony Brook and UNC Asheville.

College career
Muszynski redshirted his first season at Belmont. In his debut game, he posted 18 points, 7 rebounds and 5 blocks against Illinois State. As a freshman, he averaged 14.7 points, 5.8 rebounds, 2.7 assists and 2.2 blocks per game. He earned Ohio Valley Conference (OVC) Freshman of the Year and First Team All-OVC honors. On November 26, 2019, Muszynski posted a career-high 30 points, seven rebounds and four blocks in an 87–82 loss to Eastern Washington. On January 4, 2020, he recorded 25 points, 16 rebounds and five assists in an 87–55 win against Eastern Illinois. Muszynski helped Belmont win the 2020 OVC tournament and was named MVP after posting 25 points and eight rebounds against Murray State in the final. He averaged 15.3 points, 6.4 rebounds and 1.6 blocks per game as a sophomore, repeating on the First Team All-OVC. In his junior season opener against Howard on November 26, Muszynski became Belmont's NCAA Division I career blocks leader. As a junior, he averaged 15 points, 5.6 rebounds and 1.6 blocks per game, earning First Team All-OVC honors for a third straight year. Muszynski was again named to the First Team All-OVC as a senior.

Professional career
On August 5, 2022, he has signed with Astoria Bydgoszcz of the Polish Basketball League (PLK).

Career statistics

College

|-
| style="text-align:left;"| 2017–18
| style="text-align:left;"| Belmont
| style="text-align:center;" colspan="11"|  Redshirt
|-
| style="text-align:left;"| 2018–19 
| style="text-align:left;"| Belmont
|| 32 || 32 || 24.9 || .604 || .364 || .779 || 5.8 || 2.7 || .6 || 2.2 || 14.7
|-
| style="text-align:left;"| 2019–20 
| style="text-align:left;"| Belmont 
|| 33 || 32 || 24.8 || .596 || .327 || .660 || 6.4 || 1.7 || .4 || 1.6 || 15.3
|-
| style="text-align:left;"| 2020–21
| style="text-align:left;"| Belmont
|| 27 || 27 || 25.0 || .586 || .077 || .734 || 5.6 || 1.7 || .2 || 1.6 || 15.0
|- class="sortbottom"
| style="text-align:center;" colspan="2"| Career
|| 92 || 91 || 24.9 || .596 || .298 || .723 || 5.9 || 2.0 || .4 || 1.8 || 15.0

References

External links
Belmont Bruins bio

1998 births
Living people
American men's basketball players
Astoria Bydgoszcz players
Basketball players from Ohio
Belmont Bruins men's basketball players
Centers (basketball)
People from Pickerington, Ohio